Four ships of the Royal Navy have borne the name HMS Ettrick after the Scottish river, Ettrick Water.

Her bows were blown off when she was torpedoed by German submarine UC-61 in 1917, and she was not repaired. She was sold for breaking in 1919.
 HMS Ettrick was the Mersey-type Admiralty trawler Samuel Jameson, launched in 1918 and renamed Ettrick in 1920. She was sold in 1926, renamed Loughrigg and served during World War II as Phyllisia.
 , a  launched in 1943 and lent to the Royal Canadian Navy between 1944 and 1945. She was broken up in 1953.

Notes

References
 

Royal Navy ship names